In Indo-European studies, the salmon problem or salmon argument (also known by the German term Lachsargument) is an outdated argument in favour of placing the Indo-European urheimat in the Baltic region, as opposed to the Eurasian Steppe, based on the cognate etymology of the respective words for salmon in Germanic and Balto-Slavic languages.  The word's wide distribution likely means it existed in its current form in a Proto-Indo-European language.

The reasoning went as follows: Since the term for Atlantic salmon in the Germanic, Baltic and Slavic languages could be derived from a common Proto-Indo-European root *laḱs-, the urheimat of the Indo-Europeans must be where both the languages and the object it describes can be found: Northern-Central Europe. The argument was first put forward by German philologist Otto Schrader in 1883. The argument was subject to continued scholarly debate throughout the late 19th and early 20th centuries, particularly in German academia.

In 1953, German indologist Paul Thieme submitted that the descendants of *laḱs- found in the Caucasus described the brown trout (Salmo trutta) rather than the Atlantic salmon (Salmo salar). American philologist George Sherman Lane concurred in a 1970 conference paper: "In my opinion, the name in question probably did refer originally not to the Salmo salar at all, but rather to the Salmo trutta caspius of the northwest Caucasus region." That lent support to the Kurgan hypothesis.

See also 
 Historical linguistics
 Comparative method (linguistics)
 Proto-Indo-European homeland
 North European hypothesis
 Beech argument

References 

Indo-European linguistics
Indo-European studies
Origin hypotheses of ethnic groups
Salmon
1883 in science
1883 introductions